In abstract algebra, a partially ordered group is a group (G, +) equipped with a partial order "≤" that is translation-invariant; in other words, "≤" has the property that, for all a, b, and g in G, if a ≤ b then a + g ≤ b + g and g + a ≤ g + b.

An element x of G is called positive if 0 ≤ x. The set of elements 0 ≤ x is often denoted with G+, and is called the positive cone of G.

By translation invariance, we have a ≤ b if and only if 0 ≤ -a + b.
So we can reduce the partial order to a monadic property:  if and only if 

For the general group G, the existence of a positive cone specifies an order on G. A group G is a partially orderable group if and only if there exists a subset H (which is G+) of G such that:
 0 ∈ H
 if a ∈ H and b ∈ H then a + b ∈ H
 if a ∈ H then -x + a + x ∈ H for each x of G
 if a ∈ H and -a ∈ H then a = 0

A partially ordered group G with positive cone G+ is said to be unperforated if n · g ∈ G+ for some positive integer n implies g ∈ G+. Being unperforated means there is no "gap" in the positive cone G+.

If the order on the group is a linear order, then it is said to be a linearly ordered group.
If the order on the group is a lattice order, i.e. any two elements have a least upper bound, then it is a lattice-ordered group (shortly l-group, though usually typeset with a script l: ℓ-group).

A Riesz group is an unperforated partially ordered group with a property slightly weaker than being a lattice-ordered group. Namely, a Riesz group satisfies the Riesz interpolation property: if x1, x2, y1, y2 are elements of G and xi ≤ yj, then there exists z ∈ G such that xi ≤ z ≤ yj.

If G and H are two partially ordered groups, a map from G to H is a morphism of partially ordered groups if it is both a group homomorphism and a monotonic function. The partially ordered groups, together with this notion of morphism, form a category.

Partially ordered groups are used in the definition of valuations of fields.

Examples 

 The integers with their usual order
 An ordered vector space is a partially ordered group
 A Riesz space is a lattice-ordered group
 A typical example of a partially ordered group is Zn, where the group operation is componentwise addition, and we write (a1,...,an) ≤ (b1,...,bn) if and only if ai ≤ bi (in the usual order of integers) for all i = 1,..., n.
 More generally, if G is a partially ordered group and X is some set, then the set of all functions from X to G is again a partially ordered group: all operations are performed componentwise. Furthermore, every subgroup of G is a partially ordered group: it inherits the order from G.
 If A is an approximately finite-dimensional C*-algebra, or more generally, if A is a stably finite unital C*-algebra, then K0(A) is a partially ordered abelian group. (Elliott, 1976)

Properties

Archimedean 
Archimedean property of the real numbers can be generalized to partially ordered groups.

Property: A partially ordered group G is called Archimedean when an ≤ b for all natural n then a = e. Equivalently, when a≠e, then for any b∈G, there is some  such that b <an.

Integrally closed 
A partially ordered group G is called integrally closed if for all elements a and b of G, if an ≤ b for all natural n then a ≤ 1.

This property is somewhat stronger than the fact that a partially ordered group is Archimedean, though for a lattice-ordered group to be integrally closed and to be Archimedean is equivalent.
There is a theorem that every integrally closed directed group is already abelian.  This has to do with the fact that a directed group is embeddable into a complete lattice-ordered group if and only if it is integrally closed.

See also

Note

References

M. Anderson and T. Feil, Lattice Ordered Groups: an Introduction, D. Reidel, 1988.

M. R. Darnel, The Theory of Lattice-Ordered Groups, Lecture Notes in Pure and Applied Mathematics 187, Marcel Dekker, 1995.
L. Fuchs, Partially Ordered Algebraic Systems, Pergamon Press, 1963.

V. M. Kopytov and A. I. Kokorin (trans. by D. Louvish), Fully Ordered Groups, Halsted Press (John Wiley & Sons), 1974.
V. M. Kopytov and N. Ya. Medvedev, Right-ordered groups, Siberian School of Algebra and Logic, Consultants Bureau, 1996.

R. B. Mura and A. Rhemtulla, Orderable groups, Lecture Notes in Pure and Applied Mathematics 27, Marcel Dekker, 1977.
, chap. 9.

Further reading

External links 

 

Ordered algebraic structures
Ordered groups
Order theory